Dave Larder (born ) is an English professional rugby league footballer who currently plays in National League One with Halifax. He is the son of rugby union defensive coach Phil Larder.

Career
Larder is a highly rated  who turned down the offer of playing full-time rugby in the Super League with Leigh Centurions, mainly due to his work commitments. Having turned down the offer of becoming a full-time player, Larder joined Halifax in 2004, instantly becoming popular with the fans. Larder captained Halifax in the 2007 season and has continued to until the 2011 season. In the 2011 season he joined the coaching team. In 2016 he became the head coach of Huddersfield Y.M.C.A.

References

External links
 Halifax profile

Halifax R.L.F.C. players
1976 births
Living people
Rugby league second-rows
Rugby articles needing expert attention